

Gotthard Frantz  (5 May 1888 – 21 January 1973) was a general in the Luftwaffe of Nazi Germany during World War II. He was a recipient of the Knight's Cross of the Iron Cross.

Awards

 Knight's Cross of the Iron Cross on 18 May 1943 as Generalleutnant and commander of 19. Flak-Division

References

Citations

Bibliography

 

1888 births
1973 deaths
Military personnel from Berlin
People from the Province of Brandenburg
German Army personnel of World War I
Luftwaffe World War II generals
Recipients of the clasp to the Iron Cross, 1st class
Recipients of the Gold German Cross
Recipients of the Knight's Cross of the Iron Cross
German prisoners of war in World War II held by the Soviet Union
German prisoners of war in World War II held by the United States
Prussian Army personnel
Lieutenant generals of the Luftwaffe